Forrest Gump is a 1994 feature film starring Tom Hanks.

Forrest Gump may also refer to:

 Forrest Gump (novel), 1986 novel by Winston Groom
 Forrest Gump (character), main character created by Winston Groom
 Forrest Gump – Original Motion Picture Score, film score by Alan Silvestri
 Forrest Gump: The Soundtrack, a soundtrack compilation album of the film
 "Forrest Gump", a song by Frank Ocean from the album Channel Orange

See also
 "Gump" (song), by Weird Al Yankovic, about the character